All in a Day is a 1986 children's picture book  written and illustrated by Mitsumasa Anno. It features illustrations by Anno and several other internationally known illustrators: Eric Carle, Raymond Briggs, Nicolai Ye. Popov, Akiko Hayashi, Gian Calvi, Leo and Diane Dillon, Zhu Chengliang and Ron Brooks.

Description
Ten artists illustrate the simultaneous moments on January 1 in the lives of children in nine locations on Earth. Information about planetary rotation, world time zones and seasons follows the inviting full-colour wordless picture vignettes.

The inspiration for this book arose when Anno was overwhelmed by the sunset on earth at Uskudar in Istanbul. Anno then realized that the sun which was just setting in front of him was at the very same time, a rising sun in some other country. This meant that this same sun was going down in a country at war and at that same time, it was rising in a country at peace.

Review
School Library Journal said it was "a great success at conveying the warmth, richness, and variety of people" and Booklist noted that it "promotes peace and mutual understanding among children around the world."

References

External links
 Reading resource for Mathematics Council, Alberta Teachers' Association.
 Goodreads Book Review
 Common Sense Media Book Review
 All in a Day, 

Japanese picture books
1986 children's books
Picture books by Eric Carle
Books illustrated by Leo and Diane Dillon
Picture books by Raymond Briggs
Philomel Books books
Hamish Hamilton books
American picture books